Cobham's theorem is a theorem in combinatorics on words that has important connections with number theory, notably transcendental numbers, and automata theory. Informally, the theorem gives the condition for the members of a set S of natural numbers written in bases b1 and base b2 to be recognised by finite automata. Specifically, consider bases b1 and b2 such that they are not powers of the same integer. Cobham's theorem states that S written in bases b1 and b2 is recognised by finite automata if and only if S is a finite union of arithmetic progressions. The theorem was proved by Alan Cobham in 1969 and has since given rise to many extensions and generalisations.

Definitions 
Let  be an integer. The representation of a natural number  in base  is the sequence of digits  such that

 

The word  is often denoted , or more simply, .

A set of natural numbers S is recognisable in base  or more simply -recognisable or -automatic if the set  of the representations of its elements in base  is a language recognisable by a finite automaton on the alphabet .

For example, 2 and 3 are multiplicatively independent, but 8 and 16 are not since . Two integers are multiplicatively dependent if and only if they are powers of a same third integer.

Problem statements

Original problem statement 
More equivalent statements of the theorem have been given. The original version by Cobham is the following: Another way to state the theorem is by using automatic sequences. Cobham himself calls them "uniform tag sequences.". The following form is found in Allouche and Shallit's book:We can show that the characteristic sequence of a set of natural numbers S recognisable by finite automata in base k is a k-automatic sequence and that conversely, for all k-automatic sequences  and all integers , the set  of natural numbers  such that  is recognisable in base .

Formulation in logic 
Cobham's theorem can be formulated in first-order logic using a theorem proven by Büchi in 1960. This formulation in logic allows for extensions and generalisations. The logical expression uses the theory

 

Examples:

 The set of odd numbers is definable (without ) by the formula 
 The set  of the powers of 2 is definable by the simple formula .
We can push the analogy with logic further by noting that S is first-order definable in Presburger arithmetic if and only if it is ultimately periodic. So, a set S is definable in the logics  and  if and only if it is definable in Presburger arithmetic.

Generalisations

Approach by morphisms 
An automatic sequence is a particular morphic word, whose morphism is uniform, meaning that the length of the images generated by the morphism for each letter of its input alphabet is the same. A set of integers is hence k-recognisable if and only if its characteristic sequence is generated by a uniform morphism followed by a coding, where a coding is a morphism that maps each letter of the input alphabet to a letter of the output alphabet. For example, the characteristic sequence of the powers of 2 is produced by the 2-uniform morphism (meaning each letter is mapped to a word of length 2) over the alphabet  defined by

 

which generates the infinite word

 ,

 .

The notion has been extended as follows: a morphic word  is -substitutive for a certain number  if when written in the form

 

  is the dominant eigenvalue of the matrix of morphism , namely, the matrix , where  is the number of occurrences of the letter  in the word .

A set S of natural numbers is -recognisable if its characteristic sequence  is -substitutive.

A last definition: a Perron number is an algebraic number  such that all its conjugates belong to the disc . These are exactly the dominant eigenvalues of the primitive matrices of positive integers.

We then have the following statement:

Logic approach 
The logic equivalent permits to consider more general situations: the automatic sequences over the natural numbers  or recognisable sets have been extended to the integers , to the Cartesian products , to the real numbers  and to the Cartesian products .

 Extension to 

We code the base  integers by prepending to the representation of a positive integer the digit , and by representing negative integers by  followed by the number's -complement.

 Extension to 

Other extensions have been given to the real numbers and vectors of real numbers.

Proofs 
Samuel Eilenberg announced the theorem without proof in his book; he says "The proof is correct, long, and hard. It is a challenge to find a more reasonable proof of this fine theorem." Georges Hansel proposed a more simple proof, published in the not-easily accessible proceedings of a conference. The proof of Dominique Perrin and that of Allouche and Shallit's book contains the same error in one of the lemmas, mentioned in the list of errata of the book. This error was uncovered in a note by Tomi Kärki, and corrected by Michel Rigo and Laurent Waxweiler. This part of the proof has been recently written.

In January 2018, Thijmen J. P. Krebs announced, on Arxiv, a simplified proof of the original theorem, based on Dirichlet's approximation criterion instead of that of Kronecker; the article appeared in 2021. The employed method has been refined and used by Mol, Rampersad, Shallit and Stipulanti.

Notes and references

Bibliography 

 

Combinatorics
Number theory
Theoretical computer science
Finite automata
Information theory
Combinatorics on words